Cinepazet is a vasodilator and is an ethyl ester derivative of cinepazic acid.

Synthesis

The alkylation between benzylpiperazine (1) and ethyl chloroacetate (2) gives ethyl 2-(4-benzylpiperazin-1-yl)acetate [23173-76-4] (3). The benzyl protecting group is easily cleaved by catalytic hydrogenation giving ethyl 2-(piperazin-1-yl)acetate [40004-08-8] (4). The Schotten-Baumann reaction with 3,4,5-trimethoxycinnamoyl chloride [4521-61-3] (5) gives the amide, and hence completing the synthesis of Cinepazet (6).

References 

Alkene derivatives
Carboxamides
Ethyl esters
Catechol ethers
Piperazines
Vasodilators